Bararq Bahtobe (born 22 February 1962) is an Ivorian boxer. He competed in the men's bantamweight event at the 1984 Summer Olympics.

References

1962 births
Living people
Ivorian male boxers
Olympic boxers of Ivory Coast
Boxers at the 1984 Summer Olympics
Place of birth missing (living people)
Bantamweight boxers